Ainderby Miers with Holtby is a civil parish in the Hambleton district of North Yorkshire, England. The population taken at the 2011 Census was less than 100. Information is now kept with the parish of Kirkby Fleetham with Fencote.  The parish is bounded to the east by the A1 road, and is about three miles south of Catterick.  It includes the hamlets of Ainderby Miers and Holtby Grange.

External links 
 
 

Civil parishes in North Yorkshire